The U23 Liège–Bastogne–Liège or Liège–Bastogne–Liège Espoirs is a cycling race in Belgium, held eight days before the cycling classic, the Liège–Bastogne–Liège.  This amateur version of the race began in 1986, and since 2005, it has been open to professionals under the age of 23.

Winners

External links
Palmarès sur memoire-du-cyclisme.net (French)

UCI Europe Tour races
Cycle races in Belgium
Recurring sporting events established in 1986
1986 establishments in Belgium
U23
Under-23 cycle racing